Tony Gaskins is a motivational speaker, author and life coach. Having appeared on The Oprah Winfrey Show, The Tyra Banks Show and TBN's 700 Club. He speaks on various topics including business, success and self-development but is most known for his love and relationship advice for young girls which has garnered him a large Facebook, Instagram, and Twitter following. In 2011, he made Under30Ceo's Top 50 Most Motivational People on the Web.

Books
 A Woman's Influence (2020)
 Make it Work (2019)
 What Daddy Never Told His Little Girl (2007)
 Eight Mistakes Women Make in Relationships (2011)
 The Road to Destiny (2011)
 Notebook of Love (2011)
 Mrs. Right (2012)
 The New Guy Code (2013)
 CEO of Me (2013)
 Single is Not a Curse (2013)

References

External links
  Official Website

Living people
American motivational speakers
American motivational writers
American self-help writers
Life coaches
Relationship education
Popular psychology
1984 births